France–Mongolia relations are the bilateral relations of France and Mongolia. Modern relations began in 1965. Historically, the Mongol Empire and Kingdom of France had been part of the Franco-Mongol alliance.

There is a French embassy in Ulaanbaatar, and a Mongolian embassy in Paris.

References

 
Mongolia
Bilateral relations of Mongolia